Encephalartos is a genus of cycad native to Africa. Several species of Encephalartos are commonly referred to as bread trees, bread palms or kaffir bread, since a bread-like starchy food can be prepared from the centre of the stem. The genus name is derived from the Greek words en (within), kephalē (head), and artos (bread), referring to the use of the pith to make food. They are, in evolutionary terms, some of the most primitive living gymnosperms.

All the species are endangered, some critically, due to their exploitation by collectors and traditional medicine gatherers. The whole genus is listed under CITES Appendix I which prohibits international trade in specimens of these species except for certain non-commercial motives, such as scientific research.

Description
Several of the species possess stout trunks. The persistent, pinnate leaves are arranged in a terminal spreading crown, or ascending. The rigid leaflets are variously spiny or incised along their margins. The leaflets have a number of parallel veins and no central vein.

Cones
Male cones are elongated, and three or four may appear at a time. In some species, male cones with ripe pollen emit a nauseating odour. When the pollen has been shed and the males cones decay, a strong odour of acetic acid has also been noted.

Roots
Colonies of the cyanobacterium Nostoc punctiforme occur in apparent symbiosis inside the root tissue, while the rootlets produce root tubercles at ground level which harbour a mycorrhizal fungus of uncertain function, which is however suspected to facilitate the capturing of nitrogen from the air.

Food value

Human consumption
In several species the pith of the trunk contains a copious amount of high quality starch below the crown. This was formerly cut out by native people as food. Thunberg recorded around 1772 that the Hottentots removed the stem's pith at the crown and buried it wrapped in animal skin for about two months, after which they recovered it for kneading into bread, whence the vernacular name "broodboom" (i.e. bread tree). The burial of the pith apparently facilitated its fermentation and softening, and the dough was lightly roasted over a coal fire. In 1779 Paterson likewise found that the pith of a "large palm" near King William's Town was utilised by the Africans and Hottentots as bread. The pith was removed and left till sourish, before it was kneaded into bread.

Animal food
Their large seeds consist of an often poisonous kernel covered by an edible fleshy layer. Female cones are consequently destroyed by baboons, as they relish the pith around the seeds. Vervet monkeys, rodents and birds also feed on the seeds, but due to their unpredictable toxic qualities they are not recommended for human consumption.

Insects
The early larval instars of some aposematic, day-flying looper moths are specific to cycads, and genus Encephalartos is one of their food plants. They include the leopard magpie (most Encephalartos spp., other cycads, etc.), Millar's tiger (cultivated E. villosus), dimorphic tiger (cycads under forest canopy), spotted tigerlet (E. villosus), inflamed tigerlet (E. villosus), Staude's tigerlet (E. ngoyanus, cultivated E. villosus and Stangeria) and pallid grey (E. natalensis).

In cultivation various scale insects attack the leaves of the genus. These include cycad aulacaspis scale, zamia scale and latania scale.

Taxonomy
The genus was named by German botanist Johann Georg Christian Lehmann in 1834. All cycads except Cycas had been regarded as members of the genus Zamia until then, and some botanists continued to follow this line for many years after Lehmann had separated Encephalartos as a separate genus. His concept was originally much broader than the one accepted today, including also the Australian plants we now know as Macrozamia and Lepidozamia.

Species

See also
List of Southern African indigenous trees

References

External links

List of African Cycads
Cycad Society of South Africa
Indonesia Cycads Forum